Juha is a 1999 Finnish film produced, written, and directed by Aki Kaurismäki. The film is loosely based on a famous 1911 novel by the Finnish author Juhani Aho marking this as the fourth time the novel was adapted for the screen. The original story takes place in the 18th century but Kaurismäki's remake is set sometime in the latter half of the 20th century. It tells the story of a love triangle where a simple peasant woman leaves her husband after falling in love with a modern city slicker. Juha is a silent film shot in black-and-white with dialogue in the form of intertitles. Special release prints with titles in several different languages were produced for international distribution.

Plot 
Marja (Kati Outinen) is a simple peasant woman married to her older husband Juha (Sakari Kuosmanen). They lead a very simple country life, spending most of their days farming and tending to their livestock. Marja's world is turned upside down when Shemeikka (André Wilms) comes to the happily married couple asking them for help with his broken down sports convertible and a place to spend the night. As Juha works to repair the car, Shemeikka attempts to lure Marja to leave Juha and come to the city with him. A hesitant Marja does not want to leave her husband at first but ultimately gives in to temptation after dreaming of a wonderful new life in a big city. Shemeikka and Marja leave for the city but Marja's dream quickly becomes a nightmare when Shemeikka enslaves her in a brothel.

Cast and characters
Sakari Kuosmanen - Juha
Kati Outinen - Marja
André Wilms - Shemeikka
Markku Peltola - Driver
Elina Salo - Shemeikka's Sister
Ona Kamu - Shemeikka's Woman
Outi Mäenpää - Shemeikka's Woman
Tuire Tuomisto - Shemeikka's Woman
Esko Nikkari - Rural Police Chief

Critical response
On Rotten Tomatoes, Juha has a rating of 40%, based on five reviews, with an average rating of 6.3/10.

See also
1999 in film
Cinema of Finland
List of Finnish films: 1990s
Juha (1937 film), a 1937 adaptation of the same novel

References

External links 
 
 
 
 
 
 
 

1999 films
Films directed by Aki Kaurismäki
1990s Finnish-language films
Finnish black-and-white films
1999 romantic comedy-drama films
Films based on Finnish novels
Finnish romantic comedy films
Silent films